Nina Afanasievna Sazonova (1917 —  2004) was a leading actress of the Soviet Army Theatre in Moscow.

The daughter of a peasant, she joined Aleksey Popov's theatre school at the age of 17. Popov went on to direct her in a number of productions at the Soviet Army Theatre. In the 1960s, she appeared in supporting roles in a slew of Soviet films and gained wider renown for her portrayal of a World War II survivor in the 1965 melodrama Womenfolk. Sazonova was named a People's Artist of the USSR in 1977 and was awarded the Order of Lenin in 1987.

Her later years were plagued by a series of horrible incidents, such as being severely beaten by her drunken son who proceeded to jump 11 stories out of an apartment window to his death.

Selected filmography
 A Simple Story (1960)
 Chronicle of Flaming Years (1961)
 There Is Such a Lad (1964)
 Woman's World (1967)
 Zigzag of Success (1968)
 Day by Day (1971–72)

References

External links

1917 births
People from Vladimir Governorate
2004 deaths

Soviet stage actresses
Soviet film actresses
Soviet television actresses
People's Artists of the USSR
People's Artists of the RSFSR
Honored Artists of the RSFSR
Recipients of the Order of Lenin
Burials at Vagankovo Cemetery